Operation Fish was the World War II evacuation of British wealth from the UK to Canada. It was the largest known movement of wealth in history.

Background
In September 1939, the British government decreed that all people living in the UK had to declare their securities with the Treasury. Even before Operation Fish, convoys had been sent with gold and money worth millions of pounds to purchase weapons from the United States. One such run involved Commodore Augustus Willington Shelton Agar and his ship . At 23:18 on 3 October 1939, HMS Emerald dropped anchor in Plymouth, England. A short time later, Agar was being briefed by Rear-Admiral Lancelot Holland on his mission. The written instructions are below.

On 7 October 1939, Emerald sailed from Plymouth for Halifax, Nova Scotia, with the gold bullion from the Bank of England, bound for Montreal, Quebec, Canada, to be used to pay for American war materials. As this voyage was under the strictest secrecy, the crew were outfitted with "tropical white" uniforms, to confuse German agents. In the company of the two old battleships HMS Revenge and HMS Resolution and her sister ship HMS Enterprise, as well as the old cruiser HMS Caradoc, the Emerald ran into some of the heaviest seas that Agar encountered. By the time the convoy reached Halifax, the Emerald had lost her ship's boats, rafts, and various depth charges, wires, shackles, and other valuable equipment, not to mention her spotter plane, a Fairey Seafox.

When Winston Churchill formed his government in 1940 the war was going badly for the Allies. As a guarantee that the Empire could continue the fight if the UK was overrun, Churchill devised a plan to ship British wealth to the safety of Canada. Using their wartime powers the Churchill government confiscated the securities that the British people were forced to register at the beginning of the year and under the cover of secrecy moved them to the port of Greenock in Scotland. Then men sworn to secrecy loaded the wealth onto the Emerald-class light cruiser HMS Emerald. The ship departed on 24 June 1940 and with an escort of some destroyers sailed to Canada. Again another fierce storm endangered the operation when high seas forced the ships to slow their speed making them easy targets for any prowling U-boats. When they finally reached Halifax, on 1 July 1940, the British treasure was transferred to trains and the gold sent to Ottawa while the securities were shipped to the Sun Life Building in Montreal.

Another Operation Fish convoy sailed on 5 July 1940, comprising five ships loaded with $1.7 billion (US$ billion in ), which was the largest movement of wealth in history. Offshore, they met their escort, which included the battleship , a cruiser and several destroyers. Trouble arose when one of the convoy ships, a Polish ship, the Batory, loaded with treasure, had engine trouble and had to drop out of the convoy, escorted by only ; the two ships then encountered heavy fog and, because of the dangers of icebergs, came to a halt, making them easy targets for any U-boats that might find them; eventually, repairs were made and both ships were able to make it to Halifax days after the other treasure ships had landed.

Storage
The British securities were locked in a specially constructed underground vault that was rushed into existence three storeys beneath the Sun Life Building in Montreal, and were guarded around the clock by the Royal Canadian Mounted Police. A persistent rumour that the Crown Jewels of the United Kingdom were stored there was deliberately spread in Montreal to account for increased activity at the building. The extremely secretive United Kingdom Security Deposit, operating in the vault, arranged for the sale of Britain's negotiable securities on the New York Stock Exchange over the next few years to pay for Britain's war expenses. The 5,000 employees of Sun Life never suspected what was stored in their basement, and while unloading the treasure ships, not one crate of the cargo went missing. Even though thousands of people were involved, Axis intelligence agencies never found out about the operation. Hundreds of government accountants and bankers worked tirelessly to catalogue the contents of thousands of crates taken off the ships. When they were finished it was determined that $2.5 billion (US$ billion in ) had been shipped from the UK to Canada without one gold bar being lost.

Commemoration
A stone plaque on the outer wall of Martins Bank on Water Street in Liverpool commemorates the gold stored there en route to Canada: "In May 1940 when this country was threatened with invasion part of the nation's gold reserve was brought from London and lowered through the hatch for safe keeping in the vaults of Martins Bank."

In fiction
The 1993 BBC drama The Bullion Boys depicts the 1940 transport of Bank of England gold to Canada via Liverpool, and a plot by a group of Liverpool dock workers to steal some of it.

See also
Gold reserves of the United Kingdom
Flight of the Norwegian National Treasury
Moscow gold (Spain) – gold reserves sent by Republican Spain to the Soviet Union during the Spanish Civil War
Romanian Treasure, gold reserves sent (alongside other valuables) by Romania to Russia for safekeeping during World War I, but never returned

References

Bibliography
 - Total pages: 244 
 - Total pages: 377

External links
 

Conflicts in 1940
Battles and operations of World War II
Naval battles of World War II involving Germany
United Kingdom in World War II
Battles of World War II involving Canada
Military history of Canada during World War II
Canada–United Kingdom relations
Wealth in the United Kingdom
Gold in the United Kingdom
History of Inverclyde
Greenock
Military history of Greenock
Scotland in World War II
Military operations of World War II